Sack of Kraków may refer to the following events:
Mongol sacking of Kraków (1241)
Mongol sacking of Kraków (1260)
Prussian sacking of Kraków, notably, of Polish Crown Jewels (1794-1795)